Valley Railroad 3025 is a China Railways SY class steam locomotive that was built in 1989 by the Tangshan Locomotive and Rolling Stock Works for the Knox and Kane Railroad, where it spent its life until that railroad's demise. It was purchased by the Valley Railroad Company in 2008 and has since been rebuilt as a masquerade of a New Haven J-1 "Mikado" locomotive and re-numbered 3025.

History 
Knox and Kane Railroad 1658, as it was then known, was one of three China Railways SY class steam locomotives that were built by the Tangshan Locomotive and Rolling Stock Works in 1989 exclusively for tourist operations in the United States. Sloan Cornell, the founder of the Knox and Kane Railroad, purchased the locomotive at an undisclosed cost, and it arrived in Pennsylvania in the beginning of 1990.

The locomotive ran for the Knox and Kane between 1990 and spring of 2006, when the railroad ceased all operations. In storage in an engine house in Kane, locomotive 58 and other rolling stock was subjected to an early morning arson attack on March 16, 2008. The locomotive was severely damaged, more so than its housemate, the 2-8-0 No. 38, which had thicker boiler skin. Its cab was lined with wood, which was completely destroyed.

On October 10, the locomotive was purchased at a liquidation auction by the Valley Railroad. The new owners planned to restore the locomotive to operating condition, and simultaneously transform its appearance to that of a New York, New Haven and Hartford Railroad locomotive, to be numbered 3025. Restoration was completed in 2011, and the locomotive entered revenue service on November 25, 2011, pulling the North Pole Express. It has since become one of the railroad's regular road locomotives, and took locomotive No. 40's title as the railroad's largest locomotive.

Gallery

References

2-8-2 locomotives
Individual locomotives of the United States
Steam locomotives of China
Steam locomotives of the United States
Standard gauge locomotives of the United States
Railway locomotives introduced in 1989
Preserved steam locomotives of Connecticut